Marshall C. Nichols was a member of the Wisconsin State Assembly.

Biography
Nichols was born on January 17, 1838, in Hancock County, Illinois. During the American Civil War, he was a captain with the 42nd Wisconsin Volunteer Infantry Regiment of the Union Army. He was a merchant by trade.

On September 11, 1867, Nichols married Hettie M. Rusk. They would have six children. Hettie was a National Secretary of the Woman's Relief Corps and niece of Jeremiah McLain Rusk. Jeremiah was a brevet brigadier general before becoming a member of the United States House of Representatives, the 15th Governor of Wisconsin and the 2nd United States Secretary of Agriculture. Nichols died on April 8, 1906.

Assembly career
Nichols was a member of the Assembly in 1883. He was a Republican.

References

External links

Ancestry.com

People from Hancock County, Illinois
People of Wisconsin in the American Civil War
Union Army officers
American merchants
1838 births
1906 deaths
Burials in Wisconsin
19th-century American politicians
19th-century American businesspeople
Military personnel from Illinois
Republican Party members of the Wisconsin State Assembly